Bonanza is an American western television series (1959–1973).

Bonanza may also refer to:

Towns and cities
In the United States
Bonanza, Arkansas
Bonanza, Colorado
Bonanza, Georgia
Bonanza, Idaho
Bonanza, Kentucky
Bonanza, Missouri
Bonanza, Oregon
Bonanza, Utah
Bonanza City, New Mexico
Bonanza Grove, Minnesota

Elsewhere
Bonanza, Alberta, Canada
Bonanza, Spain
Bonanza, Nicaragua

Other uses
Comstock Lode bonanza
Bonanza, "Book Four" portion of the Baroque Cycle novel The Confusion 
Ponderosa/Bonanza Steakhouse, restaurant
Bonanza Gift Shop
Bonanza Range, a mountain range on Vancouver Island, British Columbia, Canada
Bonanza (Michael Rose album), 1999
Bonanza Banzai band, 1988
Bonanza (Panda album), 2012
Beechcraft Bonanza, a general aviation aircraft

See also
Bonanza Creek, a tributary of the Klondike River the Yukon Territory, Canada
Bohnanza, a German-style card game